CHA or Cha may refer to:

Sports 
 Canadian Hockey Association (disambiguation)
 College Hockey America, the NCAA Division I conference
 College Hockey Association, the ACHA Division II conference
 Continental Hockey Association
 Charlotte Hornets, a basketball team

University 

 CHA University

Places 
 Chah (Cameroon), a village affected by the Lake Nyos gas eruption
 Chad (ISO and FIFA country code: CHA), a landlocked country in Central Africa
 Chattanooga Metropolitan Airport (IATA airport code: CHA), an airport in Chattanooga, Tennessee
 Charlotte, North Carolina

Science 
 Chamaeleon (constellation)
 Circumhorizontal arc, an atmospheric optical phenomenon
 Circumhorizon arc

People 
 Cha (Chinese surname)
 Cha (Korean surname)
Cha (name)

Other 
Cha (album), a 1982 album by Jo Jo Zep
 Cambridge Health Alliance, a teaching hospital of Harvard Medical School
 Canadian Heraldic Authority, part of the Canadian honours system
 Canadian Heritage Alliance
 Canadian Historical Association
 Carver–Hawkeye Arena, Iowa City, Iowa
 Catholic Health Association of the United States
 Cha: An Asian Literary Journal, Hong Kong-based online English literary journal
 Chamorro language, ISO 639-2 code
 Cha (Indic), a glyph in the Brahmic family of scripts
 Cha., an abbreviation of the name Charles
 Chicago Housing Authority
 Chunta Aragonesista (Aragonese Council), a political party of Aragon, Spain
 China Telecom (NYSE: CHA)
 Chả, a type of Vietnamese sausage
 Chestnut Hill Academy, Philadelphia, Pennsylvania
 Cultural Heritage Administration, an agency of the South Korean government
 Customs house agent, a licensed agent for transactions at any Customs station
 Certified Hotel Administrator, a certification from the American Hotel & Lodging Educational Institute
 The Chinese, Japanese and Korean term for tea

See also 
 Cha-cha-chá (music)